The 1996 Atlantic hurricane season had 13 named storms, of which 9 became hurricanes and 6 became major hurricanes (hurricanes that are classified as Category 3 or higher). These major hurricanes were Bertha, Edouard, Fran, Hortense, Isidore, and Lili. This timeline documents all the storm formations, strengthening, weakening, landfalls, extratropical transitions, as well as dissipation. The timeline also includes information that was not operationally released, meaning that information from post-storm reviews by the National Hurricane Center, such as information on a storm that was not operationally warned on, has been included. The season officially began on June 1, 1996, and ended on November 30 that same year.

The season's most destructive storms were Hurricane Cesar, Hurricane Fran, and Hurricane Hortense. Hurricane Cesar (later known as Hurricane Douglas in the Eastern Pacific basin) was the deadliest storm of the season; it killed at least 51 people and caused severe damage in northern Colombia and southern Central America. Hurricane Fran caused $3.2 billion (1996 USD; $4 billion 2009 USD) worth of damage in the United States, mostly in North Carolina, and killed 26 people. Hurricane Hortense dropped torrential rainfall on southwestern Puerto Rico and the eastern Dominican Republic, killing 21 people and leaving behind $127 million (1996 USD; $174 million 2009 USD) in damage. All three storms had their names retired by the World Meteorological Organization in the spring of 1997, and were replaced with Cristobal, Fay, and Hanna for the 2002 season, respectively.

Timeline of storms

June
June 1
The 1996 Atlantic hurricane season officially begins.

June 17

2:00 pm EDT (1600 UTC) –  Tropical depression One forms near eastern Grand Bahama.

June 18
8:00 pm EDT (0000 UTC June 19) – Tropical depression One strengthens into Tropical Storm Arthur.

June 19
8:00 pm EDT (0000 UTC June 20) – Tropical Storm Arthur makes landfall near Cape Lookout on the North Carolina Outer Banks with 40 mph (65 km/h) winds.

June 20
8:00 am EDT (1200 UTC) – Tropical Storm Arthur weakens into a tropical depression.

June 21
8:00 am EDT (1200 UTC) – Tropical Depression Arthur becomes extratropical about 350 nautical miles (400 miles, 645 km) north-northeast of Bermuda.

July
July 4
8:00 pm AST (0000 UTC July 5) – Tropical depression Two forms in the south-central Atlantic basin.

July 5
8:00 am AST (1200 UTC) – Tropical depression Two strengthens into Tropical Storm Bertha.

July 7

2:00 pm AST (1800 UTC) – Tropical Storm Bertha strengthens into Hurricane Bertha as it moves across the Leeward and Virgin Islands.

July 9
2:00 am EDT (0600 UTC) – Hurricane Bertha reaches Category 3 intensity.
2:00 pm EDT (1800 UTC) – Hurricane Bertha weakens into a Category 2 hurricane.

July 10
2:00 am EDT (0600 UTC) – Hurricane Bertha weakens into a Category 1 hurricane.

July 12
8:00 am EDT (1200 UTC) – Hurricane Bertha regains Category 2 intensity.
4:00 pm EDT (2000 UTC) – Hurricane Bertha makes landfall between Wrightsville and Topsail Beaches in North Carolina with 105 mph (170 km/h) winds.
8:00 pm EDT (0000 UTC July 13) – Hurricane Bertha weakens into a Category 1 hurricane.

July 13
2:00 am EDT (0600 UTC) – Hurricane Bertha weakens into a tropical storm.

July 14
8:00 am EDT (1200 UTC) – Tropical Storm Bertha becomes extratropical near New Brunswick.

July 24

2:00 pm AST (1800 UTC) – Tropical depression Three forms just north of Isla Margarita.

July 25
8:00 am EDT (1200 UTC) – Tropical depression Three strengthens into Tropical Storm Cesar.

July 27
8:00 am EDT (1200 UTC) – Tropical Storm Cesar strengthens into Hurricane Cesar.

July 28
12:00 am EDT (0400 UTC) – Hurricane Cesar makes landfall just north of Bluefields, Nicaragua, with 85 mph (135 km/h) winds.
8:00 am EDT (1200 UTC) – Hurricane Cesar weakens into a tropical storm.
7:00 pm CDT (0000 UTC July 29) – Tropical Storm Cesar completes its trek across Nicaragua, and becomes Tropical Storm Douglas in the Eastern Pacific.

August
August 19

2:00 am EDT (0600 UTC) – Tropical depression Four forms in the northwestern Caribbean Sea.
2:00 pm EDT (1800 UTC) – Tropical depression Four strengthens into Tropical Storm Dolly.
2:00 pm AST (1800 UTC) – Tropical depression Five forms about 100 miles (160 km) west of the Senegal/Guinea-Bissau border.

August 20
12:30 pm CDT (1730 UTC) – Tropical Storm Dolly strengthens into Hurricane Dolly as it makes its first landfall near Chetumal, Quintana Roo with 75 mph (120 km/h) winds.
7:00 pm CDT (0000 UTC August 21) – Hurricane Dolly weakens into a tropical storm.

August 21
7:00 am CDT (1200 UTC) – Tropical Storm Dolly weakens into a tropical depression.
7:00 pm CDT (0000 UTC August 22) – Tropical Depression Dolly regains tropical storm status.

August 22
2:00 am AST (0600 UTC) – Tropical depression Five, which formed about 100 miles (160 km) west of the Guinea-Bissau–Senegal border on August 19, strengthens into Tropical Storm Edouard.

August 23
7:00 am CDT (1200 UTC) – Tropical Storm Dolly regains hurricane status as it makes its second landfall midway between Tampico, Tamaulipas, and Tuxpan, Veracruz, with 80 mph (130 km/h) winds.
8:00 am AST (1200 UTC) – Tropical Storm Edouard strengthens into Hurricane Edouard.
8:00 am AST (1200 UTC) – Tropical depression Six forms just southeast of the Cape Verde Islands.
1:00 pm CDT (1800 UTC) – Hurricane Dolly weakens into a tropical storm.
7:00 pm CDT (0000 UTC August 24) – Tropical Storm Dolly weakens into a tropical depression.

August 24

8:00 am AST (1200 UTC) – Hurricane Edouard reaches Category 2 intensity.
2:00 pm AST (1800 UTC) – Hurricane Edouard reaches Category 3 intensity.
8:00 pm AST (0000 UTC August 25) – Hurricane Edouard reaches Category 4 intensity.

August 25
12:00 am MDT (0600 UTC) – Tropical Depression Dolly dissipates over the eastern North Pacific Ocean.
2:00 am AST (0600 UTC) – Hurricane Edouard reaches its peak intensity of 145 mph (230 km/h) winds and a pressure of 933 mbar, making it the strongest storm of the season.
8:00 pm AST (0000 UTC August 26) – Tropical depression Seven forms south of the Cape Verde Islands.

August 27
8:00 am AST (1200 UTC) – Tropical depression Six strengthens into Tropical Storm Fran.

August 28
2:00 am AST (0600 UTC) – Tropical depression Seven strengthens into Tropical Storm Gustav.
8:00 am AST (1200 UTC) – Hurricane Edouard weakens into a Category 3 hurricane.

August 29
8:00 am EDT (1200 UTC) – Hurricane Edouard regains Category 4 intensity.
8:00 pm AST (0000 UTC August 30) – Tropical Storm Fran strengthens into Hurricane Fran.

August 30
2:00 pm AST (1800 UTC) – Hurricane Fran weakens into a tropical storm.
8:00 pm EDT (0000 UTC August 31) – Hurricane Edouard weakens back into a Category 3 hurricane.

August 31
8:00 am AST (1200 UTC) – Tropical Storm Fran regains hurricane status.

September
September 1
8:00 am EDT (1200 UTC) – Hurricane Edouard weakens into a Category 2 hurricane.
2:00 pm AST (1800 UTC) – Tropical Storm Gustav weakens into a tropical depression.
8:00 pm EDT (0000 UTC September 2) – Hurricane Edouard weakens into a Category 1 hurricane.

September 2
2:00 am AST (0600 UTC) – Tropical Depression Gustav dissipates.
8:00 pm EDT (0000 UTC September 3) – Hurricane Edouard weakens into a tropical storm.

September 3
2:00 am EDT (0600 UTC) – Tropical Storm Edouard becomes extratropical about 100 miles (160 km) south of Yarmouth, Nova Scotia.
8:00 am AST (1200 UTC) – Tropical depression Eight forms about midway between the northern Leeward Islands and Senegal.
2:00 pm EDT (1800 UTC) – Hurricane Fran reaches Category 2 intensity.

September 4

2:00 am EDT (0600 UTC) – Hurricane Fran reaches Category 3 intensity.

September 5
8:30 pm EDT (0030 UTC September 6) – Hurricane Fran makes landfall near Cape Fear, North Carolina with 115 mph (185 km/h) winds.

September 6
2:00 am EDT (0600 UTC) – Hurricane Fran rapidly weakens to a Category 1 hurricane.
8:00 am EDT (1200 UTC) – Hurricane Fran weakens into a tropical storm.
2:00 pm EDT (1800 UTC) – Tropical Storm Fran weakens into a tropical depression.

September 7
2:00 am AST (0600 UTC) – Tropical depression Eight strengthens into Tropical Storm Hortense.

September 8
8:00 pm EDT (0000 UTC September 9) – Tropical Depression Fran becomes extratropical in southern Ontario.

September 9

2:00 am AST (0600 UTC) – Tropical Storm Hortense strengthens into Hurricane Hortense.

September 10
2:00 am EDT (0600 UTC) – Hurricane Hortense makes its first landfall near Guánica, Puerto Rico with 80 mph (130 km/h) winds.

September 11
8:00 am EDT (1200 UTC) – Hurricane Hortense reaches Category 2 intensity.
8:00 pm EDT (0000 UTC September 12) – Hurricane Hortense reaches Category 3 intensity.

September 12
8:00 am EDT (1200 UTC – Hurricane Hortense reaches Category 4 intensity.

September 13
8:00 am EDT (1200 UTC) – Hurricane Hortense weakens into a Category 3 hurricane.
8:00 pm EDT (0000 UTC September 14) – Hurricane Hortense weakens into a Category 2 hurricane.

September 14
2:00 pm AST (1800 UTC) – Hurricane Hortense weakens into a Category 1 hurricane.
11:00 pm AST (0300 UTC September 15) – Hurricane Hortense makes its second landfall in Nova Scotia with 80 mph (130 km/h) winds.

September 15
8:00 am AST (1200 UTC) – Hurricane Hortense weakens into a tropical storm.
2:00 pm AST (1800 UTC) – Tropical Storm Hortense becomes extratropical just south of Newfoundland.

September 24

8:00 am AST (1200 UTC) – Tropical depression Nine forms about 150 miles (240 km) south of Santiago, Cape Verde.

September 25
2:00 am AST (0600 UTC) – Tropical depression Nine strengthens into Tropical Storm Isidore.

September 26
2:00 am AST (0600 UTC) – Tropical Storm Isidore strengthens into Hurricane Isidore.

September 27
2:00 am AST (0600 UTC) – Hurricane Isidore reaches Category 2 intensity.
8:00 pm AST (0000 UTC September 28) – Hurricane Isidore reaches Category 3 intensity.

September 28
8:00 am AST (1200 UTC) – Hurricane Isidore weakens into a Category 2 hurricane.

September 29
2:00 am AST (0600 UTC) – Hurricane Isidore weakens into a Category 1 hurricane.
8:00 pm AST (0000 UTC September 30) – Hurricane Isidore weakens into a tropical storm.

October
October 1
8:00 am AST (1200 UTC) – Tropical Storm Isidore weakens into a tropical depression.
8:00 pm AST (0000 UTC October 2) – Tropical Depression Isidore becomes extratropical.

October 4

1:00 pm CDT (1800 UTC) – Tropical Depression Ten forms about 70 miles (110 km) east of the Tamaulipas/Veracruz border.

October 6
1:00 pm CDT (1800 UTC) – Tropical Depression Ten strengthens into Tropical Storm Josephine.

October 7
11:30 pm EDT (0330 UTC October 8) – Tropical Storm Josephine makes landfall in Taylor County, Florida, with 70 mph (110 km/h) winds.

October 8
2:00 am EDT (0600 UTC) – Tropical Storm Josephine becomes extratropical along the Georgia/Florida border.

October 11
8:00 am EDT (1200 UTC) – Tropical depression Eleven forms about midway between Belize and Great Swan Island.
2:00 pm EDT (1800 UTC) – Tropical depression Eleven strengthens into Tropical Storm Kyle.

October 12
7:00 am CDT (1200 UTC) – Tropical Storm Kyle weakens into a tropical depression.
1:00 pm CDT (1800 UTC) – Tropical Depression Kyle makes landfall near the Guatemala/Honduras border with 30 mph (50 km/h) winds.
7:00 pm CDT (0000 UTC October 13) – Tropical Depression Kyle dissipates near where it made landfall.

October 14

8:00 am EDT (1200 UTC) – Tropical depression Twelve forms just east of Nicaragua.

October 16
2:00 am EDT (0600 UTC) – Tropical depression Twelve strengthens into Tropical Storm Lili.

October 17
8:00 am EDT (1200 UTC) – Tropical Storm Lili strengthens into Hurricane Lili.

October 18
5:30 am EDT (0930 UTC) – Hurricane Lili reaches Category 2 intensity and makes landfall on the Zapata Peninsula with 100 mph (160 km/h) winds.
2:00 pm EDT (1800 UTC) – Hurricane Lili weakens into a Category 1 hurricane.
8:00 pm EDT (0000 UTC October 19) – Hurricane Lili regains Category 2 intensity.

October 19
8:00 am EDT (1200 UTC) – Hurricane Lili reaches Category 3 intensity.
2:00 pm EDT (1800 UTC) – Hurricane Lili weakens into a Category 2 hurricane.
8:00 pm EDT (0000 UTC October 20) – Hurricane Lili weakens into a Category 1 hurricane.

October 20

8:00 am AST (1200 UTC) – Hurricane Lili regains Category 2 intensity.
2:00 pm AST (1800 UTC) – Hurricane Lili weakens into a Category 1 hurricane.

October 25
8:00 am AST (1200 UTC) – Hurricane Lili regains Category 2 intensity.
2:00 pm AST (1800 UTC) – Hurricane Lili weakens into a Category 1 hurricane.

October 26
2:00 pm AST (1800 UTC) – Hurricane Lili weakens into a tropical storm.

October 27
1:00 am AST (0600 UTC) – Tropical Storm Lili becomes extratropical about 300 nautical miles (345 miles, 550 km) north-northwest of the Azores.

November
November 16
1:00 pm EST (1800 UTC) – Tropical depression Thirteen forms south of Jamaica.

November 19
1:00 am EST (0600 UTC) – Tropical depression Thirteen strengthens into Tropical Storm Marco.

November 20

1:00 am EST (0600 UTC) – Tropical Storm Marco strengthens into Hurricane Marco.
1:00 pm EST (1800 UTC) – Hurricane Marco weakens into a tropical storm.

November 23
1:00 pm EST (1800 UTC) – Tropical Storm Marco weakens into a tropical depression.

November 24
7:00 am EST (1200 UTC) – Tropical Depression Marco regains tropical storm status.

November 26
7:00 am EST (1200 UTC) – Tropical Storm Marco weakens into a tropical depression.
1:00 pm EST (1800 UTC) – Tropical Depression Marco dissipates about 100 miles (160 km) southwest of the Isle of Youth.

November 30
The 1996 Atlantic hurricane season officially ends.

See also

 Lists of Atlantic hurricanes
 Tropical cyclones in 1996

Notes

References

1996 Atlantic hurricane season
1996 Atlantic hurricane season
Articles which contain graphical timelines